Xinan is a subdistrict of the Sanshui District, Foshan, Guangdong, China.

See also
List of township-level divisions of Guangdong

References

Township-level divisions of Guangdong
Sanshui District
Subdistricts of the People's Republic of China